Zygmunt Piotr Bohusz-Szyszko (1893 in Chełm – 1982  in London) was a Polish general. During World War I he served in the Imperial Russian army.

In 1940, he was Commanding Officer Polish Independent Highland Brigade (Samodzielna Brygada Strzelcow Podhalanskich) during the Battle of Narvik in the Norwegian campaign. The forces under his command succeeded in capturing the Ankenes peninsula during May 1940.

Career
 -1931 Commanding Officer 58th Regiment
 1931-1934 Commanding Border Defence Regiment Głębokie
 1934-1938 Deputy General Officer Commanding Border Defence Corps
 1938-1939 Commanding Officer Infantry 1st Division
 1939 Commanding Officer Infantry 16th Division
 1939-1940 Commanding Officer 1st Mountain Brigade, Norway
 1941-1942 Head Polish Military Mission Moscow
 1941-1943 Chief of Staff Polish Forces in Soviet Union
 1942 General Officer Commanding 5th Division, Soviet Union
 1943-1945 Deputy General Officer Commanding II Polish Corps, Italy
 1945-1946 General Officer Commanding Army of the East
 1945-1946 General Officer Commanding II Polish Corps, Italy
 1976-1980 General Inspector of the Armed Forces

Awards and decorations
 Wound Decoration — six times
 Gold Cross of the Virtuti Militari (also Silver Cross)
 Officer's Cross of the Polonia Restituta
 Cross of Valour — four times
 Gold Cross of Merit with Swords — twice
 Norwegian War Cross

References

External links

 The Poles at Narvik

1893 births
1982 deaths
People from Chełm
People from Lublin Governorate
Polish generals
Polish legionnaires (World War I)
Polish people of the Polish–Soviet War
Polish military personnel of World War II
Officers of the Order of Polonia Restituta
Recipients of the War Cross with Sword (Norway)
Recipients of the Gold Cross of the Virtuti Militari
Recipients of the Cross of Valour (Poland)
Recipients of the Cross of Merit with Swords (Poland)